Marat Rinatovich Garayev (born 20 May 1990) is a former Russian professional football player of Tatar origin.

Club career
He played 3 seasons in the Russian Football National League for FC KAMAZ Naberezhnye Chelny.

External links
 
 Career summary at sportbox.ru
 

1990 births
Tatar people of Russia
Volga Tatars
Tatar sportspeople
People from Dimitrovgrad, Russia
Living people
Russian footballers
Association football midfielders
FC KAMAZ Naberezhnye Chelny players
FC Olimp-Dolgoprudny players
Sportspeople from Ulyanovsk Oblast